William Lansdowne (born 28 April 1959) is an English former professional footballer who played as a striker. Active in both England and Sweden, Lansdowne scored 45 goals in 169 career league games. On 24 September 2018 he was inducted into the Kalmar FF Wall of Fame.

Career
Born in Epping, Essex, Lansdowne began his career with West Ham United, making his professional debut for the club on 28 April 1979. Lansdowne later played for Charlton Athletic and Gillingham, and made a total of 47 appearances in the Football League for all three clubs.

Lansdowne later spent six seasons with Swedish club Kalmar FF and was joint-top scorer in the Allsvenskan in 1985 with 10 goals. He played in the 1987 Svenska Cupen Final, where Kalmar FF won. In September 2018, he was commemorated with a plaque at the Guldfågeln Arena.

He later played for Leytonstone & Ilford, Dagenham and Anderstorp.

After his retirement, he remained in Sweden and became a football commentator for TV4. He later commentated on greyhound racing for TV3.

Personal life
Lansdowne's father Bill was also a professional footballer who played for West Ham United. His son, Billy Jr, played for Nybro IF, IFK Berga and Lindsdals IF, in the lower levels of Swedish football.

Honours
Kalmar FF
1987 Svenska Cupen

References

1959 births
Living people
People from Epping
Sportspeople from Essex
English footballers
English expatriate footballers
Association football forwards
West Ham United F.C. players
Charlton Athletic F.C. players
Gillingham F.C. players
English Football League players
Kalmar FF players
Redbridge Forest F.C. players
Dagenham F.C. players
Anderstorps IF players
Allsvenskan players
Expatriate footballers in Sweden
English expatriate sportspeople in Sweden